Așchileu is a commune in Cluj County, Transylvania, Romania. It is composed of five villages: Așchileu Mare (the commune center; Nagyesküllő), Așchileu Mic (Kisesküllő), Cristorel (Ördögkeresztúr), Dorna (Dorna) and Fodora (Magyarfodorháza).

After the death of Gelou, the peace between the Romanians and Tuhum, the leader of the Hungarian invaders in the 10th century, was arranged at Așchileu.

Demographics

According to the 2002 census, Romanians made up 83.7% of the population, Hungarians made up 10.86% and Roma made up 5.43%.

Notes

Communes in Cluj County
Localities in Transylvania